Harutyun Karapetyan (born 7 April 1972) is an Armenian former professional footballer who played as a forward in Major League Soccer (MLS) for the Los Angeles Galaxy, the San Jose Clash, and the Tampa Bay Mutiny.

Karapetyan holds the record for the fastest hat-trick in MLS history, scoring one in five minutes in June 1998 while playing for the Galaxy in a game against FC Dallas (originally the Dallas Burn); the Galaxy eventually won the match 8–1.

Career
Karapetyan played for the Los Angeles Salsa in the American Professional Soccer League in 1993 and 1994.  In February 1996, the Galaxy selected him in the 7th round (74th overall) in the 1996 MLS Inaugural Player Draft.  A resident of Van Nuys, he was so unknown that he was inadvertently omitted from the L.A. Times's 7 February 1996 account of the draft's opening rounds. On 26 May 1996, Karapetyan scored his first two goals for the Galaxy, in a 3–2 victory over the Columbus Crew. On 7 August 1998, the Galaxy traded him to the Clash in exchange for Lawrence Lozzano. The Clash waived Karapetyan on 2 November 1998.  In May 2000, he returned to MLS when he signed with the San Jose Earthquakes. After retiring in 2000 due to injuries and coaching decisions, Karapetyan became the general sales manager at Honda of Hollywood.

References

External links
MLS career stats
 Player profile at Voetbal International

1972 births
Living people
Armenian footballers
Armenia international footballers
Armenian expatriate footballers
American Professional Soccer League players
LA Galaxy players
Los Angeles Salsa players
San Jose Earthquakes players
Tampa Bay Mutiny players
Soviet Armenians
Major League Soccer players
Expatriate soccer players in the United States
Armenian expatriate sportspeople in the United States
Association football forwards